Gian Paolo Mele (Nuoro, June 10, 1944 – Nuoro, February 15, 2018) was an Italian choral conductor, composer and ethnomusicologist. Already at an early age he was interested in ethnomusicology; he became director of the Coro di Nuoro (Chorus of Nuoro), and he edited the editions of a remarkable record and audiovisual production of Sardinia's folk music. 
 
In 2003, he composed the soundtrack of the film Ballo a tre passi by Salvatore Mereu.

See also 
 Music of Sardinia

References

1944 births
2018 deaths
People from Nuoro
Italian choral conductors
Italian male conductors (music)
Music in Sardinia